XHRIC-FM is a radio station on 101.9 FM in Poza Rica, Veracruz, Mexico. It carries the Exa FM pop format from MVS Radio. It was originally owned by one-time federal deputy Marcos López Mora, but it is now owned by Marcos López Zamora.

History
XHRIC received its concession on July 2, 1993. It has carried an MVS format throughout its existence, switching from Stereorey to Exa FM in 2001.

References

Radio stations in Veracruz